Raúl Basilio Román Garay (born 25 October 1977) is a Paraguayan football striker currently playing for Deportivo Capiatá.

Career 
Román was the member of Paraguay U-20 National football team in 1997 FIFA U-20 World Cup Final. On 28 November 1997, he signed a contract for more than a million dollars with the Beijing Guoan, making him the highest-paid player in China, but he did not play well in China. He was sent out in the Asian Cup Winners Cup 1998 Semifinals, then he was loaned back to Paraguay for two seasons. Román returned to Beijing in 2000 but found it hard to play in the Chinese football league, then moved back to Paraguay in the summer.

References

External links 
  
 
 
 

1977 births
Living people
Paraguayan footballers
Paraguay international footballers
Paraguay under-20 international footballers
Paraguayan Primera División players
Argentine Primera División players
Estudiantes de La Plata footballers
Beijing Guoan F.C. players
Club Nacional footballers
Cerro Porteño players
Paraguayan expatriates in Chile
Sportivo Luqueño players
Paraguayan expatriates in Argentina
Club Libertad footballers
Deportes Concepción (Chile) footballers
Paraguayan expatriates in China
Club Sol de América footballers
Club Olimpia footballers
Barcelona S.C. footballers
Club Olimpia (Itá) players
Expatriate footballers in Argentina
Expatriate footballers in China
Expatriate footballers in Chile
Expatriate footballers in Ecuador
People from San Lorenzo, Paraguay
Association football forwards